John Joseph Hannifin (February 25, 1883 – October 27, 1945) was an American Major League Baseball infielder.

References

Major League Baseball infielders
Philadelphia Athletics players
New York Giants (NL) players
Boston Doves players
Baseball players from Massachusetts
1883 births
1945 deaths
Norwich Reds players
Springfield Ponies players
New Haven Blues players
Jersey City Skeeters players
Elmira Colonels players
Holyoke Papermakers players